Maricopa Mountains are a range of mountains in Maricopa County, Arizona.The range runs from  and extends southeastward to . The range is protected as the North Maricopa Mountains Wilderness and South Maricopa Mountains Wilderness, divided by Arizona State Route 238 all within the Sonoran Desert National Monument.

See also

 List of mountain ranges of Arizona

References

External links

North Maricopa Mountains Wilderness BLM
South Maricopa Mountains Wilderness BLM

Mountain ranges of Maricopa County, Arizona